EML Kalev (M414) was a  of the Estonian Navy, which belonged to the Mineships Division.

Introduction
The minesweeper Kalev was a vessel in the Estonian Navy Mineships Division and also the first modernized Frauenlob-class minesweeper. At the beginning of 2004 the, Kalev was discharged from service and transferred to the Estonian Maritime Museum.

History
The EML Kalev (M414) was built in West Germany, in the Krögerwerft shipyard in Rendsburg. The vessel was launched on 25 August 1966 and entered service on 16 June 1967. It was one of ten ships of class 394 with the home port of Neustadt in Holstein. The German Navy decommissioned five of these ships in 1995; Minerva (Kalev) and her sister Diana (Olev) were given to the Estonian Navy to operate. At the handing over ceremony the vessel received the Estonian name Kalev. The third sister Undine was handed over to the Estonian Navy in 2001 as Vaindlo. In 2004 the Estonian Navy decommissioned the ships and Kalev was handed to the Estonian Maritime Museum in Tallinn.

See also
Baltic Naval Squadron

References

External links
Estonian Navy

Frauenlob-class minesweepers
Ships built in Rendsburg
1966 ships
Cold War minesweepers of Germany
Frauenlob-class minesweepers of the Estonian Navy
Estonian Mineships Division
Museum ships in Estonia